Park Kyung (Korean: 박경; born July 8, 1992), also known as just Kyung, is a South Korean rapper and record producer. He is a member of the group Block B.

Career

Pre-debut
Park Kyung started his rapping career by promoting underground along with Zico. He used the name Holke, which means Horse-K. Park Kyung debuted in 2009 with the digital single "The Letter" as duo with Zico.

2015: Problematic Men and "Ordinary Love"
On August 27, 2015, the television variety show Problematic Men announced that Park Kyung would join the show as a regular cast member, starting September 6.

A teaser image for Park Kyung's solo debut was released on September 9, 2015. His agency Seven Seasons commented, "Park Kyung displayed special affection and passion while writing and composing his solo song. This will be an opportunity for him to grow as an artist."  "Ordinary Love" was produced by Korean/American jazz hip-hop producer Kero One alongside Park Kyung featuring Park Boram on September 21, 2015. The single topped multiple Korean real-time charts the day of its release and went on to debut at no.1 on Melon as well as no.3 on the Gaon Weekly Digital Chart.

2016: "Inferiority Complex" and "Ogeul Ogeul"
On May 18, 2016, at midnight KST, a teaser video was uploaded for Park Kyung's upcoming single "Inferiority Complex" feature GFriend's Eunha, with the full video and the song being released seven days later.

In addition to releasing a song together, in May Park Kyung and Eunha starred in the second season of the online show Oh My God! Tip, in which they act out tips for handling difficult situations.

On May 25 at midnight KST, Park Kyung released the music video for his single "Inferiority Complex". It's a cute and romantic duet that features GFriend's Eunha, and in the music video the two singers play a couple with a bit of a jealously issue. The video includes fun scenes of them on a home shopping channel and their own version of the live broadcast show My Little Television, and features plenty of cute scenes of the pair. The single was ranked no.1 on a variety of Korean real-time music charts.

In October, Park Kyung appeared on the show Celebrity Bromance with fellow Problematic Men cast member Kim Ji-seok.

On December 15, it was announced that Park Kyung would be releasing the single "Ogeul Ogeul" four days later. "Ogeul Ogeul" was first released as a mixtape song in 2013; the backing track is by Kero One. The title is a transcription of the Korean expression 오글 오글, which refers to the cringing feeling experienced when one is watching something cheesy.

2017: Notebook and "Yesterday"
On January 8, Block B announced that Park Kyung would be releasing his first mini-album, Notebook, on January 18. The album contained five songs, including three that had been previously released as singles.

Park Kyung composed the song "Yesterday," which was released by Block B on February 6, 2017, as a digital single "Yesterday." The song achieved an "all kill," topping six of Korea's real-time music charts.

He also produced the song, "Love or Not," which was released by fellow Block B member Taeil on June 12. The song featured Kim Se-jeong of Gugudan and was nominated for a 2017 Melon Music Awards Hot Trend Award.  Two weeks later, "The Night Sky," a song from the drama The Best Shot was released; Park Kyung performed on and co-wrote the song.

On July 31, the MBC television network announced that Park Kyung would appear in a new variety show, Mystery Rank Show 1, 2, 3, which began broadcast August 4. The next day, Park Kyung released the digital single "Wiped" as part of an endorsement campaign. During the Chuseok holiday, Park Kyung appeared as a host for the annual international public diplomacy show Quiz on Korea, along with Leeteuk.

2018: "Don't Leave" and "Instant"
On January 8, 2018, Block B released the album Re: Montage with a lead single, "Don't Leave," written and produced by Park Kyung.

In June 2018, Park Kyung announced a new single, "Instant," which was released June 22 and featured the singer Sumin. The song is in the alternative funk style, with lyrics about how modern technology has affected human relationships.

In early July 2018, it was announced that Park Kyung was producing the upcoming single by the group The Boyz, expected to be released later in the month.

2019: "28.3°C"
On February 18, 2019, it was announced that Park Kyung would hold a solo fan meeting, titled "28.3°C," on March 9 and March 10 in Seoul. Tickets to the meeting sold out February 25.

In April 2019, it was announced that Taeil and Park Kyung would hold two concerts in Seoul together on May 25 and 26.

On November 24, 2019, Park Kyung published a tweet, which was later deleted, accusing six acts of engaging in "sajaegi," or chart manipulation, in which an artist buys or streams their own music in bulk in order to place higher on the music charts. The artists all denied manipulating the charts and announced their intentions to file legal actions against Park Kyung for defamation. The publicity surrounding the incident led several industry insiders to publicly state that sajaegi was increasingly impacting Korea's digital charts.

On December 7 and 8, 2019, Park Kyung held a solo fan meeting, "28.12°C," in Seoul.

2020–present: Military service

In September 2020, Park Kyung received a fine of approximately $4,000 for defamation as a result of his tweet accusing other artists of chart manipulation.

On October 14, it was announced that Park Kyung would begin the military service required of South Korean men on October 19, serving for approximately a year and a half. The start of his service had been delayed because of the legal actions against him.

In April 2022, it was announced that Park Kyung, who had originally been scheduled to be discharged that month, had for health reasons switched from military service to public service, delaying his discharge.

Personal life
He is a member of Mensa International.

Controversy 
On September 20, 2020, an anonymous person who attended middle school with Park wrote a post on Instagram accusing him of committing school violence, specifically towards students with special needs. Park released an apology via social media on September 29.

The production team behind JTBC's Knowing Bros shared that they decided not to air the October 10 episode with Park Kyung following the bullying controversy. On October 15, a Korean YouTuber released a recording of an executive from the agency of one of the artists Park had accused of chart manipulation saying that he was responsible for discovering and publicizing the bullying allegations.

Discography

Extended plays

Singles

Soundtrack appearances

Filmography

Drama

Variety show

Radio shows

Music videos

Awards and nominations

Music programs

Show! Music Core 

|-  
| 2015
| October 3
| "Ordinary Love"
|}

References

External links

South Korean male idols
Rappers from Seoul
South Korean male rappers
South Korean pop singers
South Korean singer-songwriters
Living people
1992 births
Block B members
KQ Entertainment artists
Mensans
South Korean male singer-songwriters
South Korean hip hop record producers